In linguistics, semelfactive is a class of aktionsart or lexical aspect (verb aspects that reflect the temporal flow of the denoted event, lexically incorporated into the verb's root itself rather than grammatically expressed by inflections or auxiliary verbs).  The event represented by a semelfactive verb is punctual (instantaneous, taking just a moment), perfective (treated as a complete action with no explicit internal temporal structure), and atelic (not having a goal). Semelfactive verbs include "blink", "sneeze", and "knock".

The idea of semelfactive as a category of lexical aspect was first posited by Bernard Comrie in addition to the more commonly known categories such as verbs of Activity, Accomplishment, Achievement, and State.  The term's use in the realm of grammatical aspect is analogous in meaning to "iterative".

References

Further reading
 

Verb types
Grammatical aspects
Syntax–semantics interface